Janez Bole (March 7, 1919 - February 21, 2007 in Ljubljana)  was a Slovenian composer.

See also
List of Slovenian composers

Sources
Slovenian Wikipedia

1919 births
2007 deaths
Slovenian composers
Male composers
Musicians from Ljubljana
Yugoslav musicians
Slovenian male musicians